Love Is Love is a 144-page graphic novel released in December 2016 by IDW Publishing in collaboration with DC Entertainment with many characters appearing from other publishers and franchises with explicit permission in tribute to the victims of the Orlando nightclub shooting. The comic became a New York Times bestseller and over US$165,000 was raised by the sales, which was donated to the victims. The comic was produced with volunteer work by dozens of artists and featured the first official comic based on the Harry Potter media franchise.

Background

Publication history

Format
Unlike most graphic novels, the book does not contain a cohesive story or several shorter stories spanning several pages but instead a mass anthology with one or two-page-long shorts, comic strips or single illustrated pages lacking panels or dialogue bubbles. IDW Publishing simply referred to it as an "oversize comic", as did Goodreads, Geek.com, and Comic Book Resources.

List of contributors
The following is a list of contributors listed in the Love is Love comic.

Writers

 Fernando Blanco
 Ellie Ann Lang
 Jim Zub
 Patrick Zircher
 Justin Zimmerman
 Joshua Yehl
 Jennie Wood
 G. Willow Wilson
 Rob Williams
 Christina Weir
 Kurtis Weibe
 Matt Wagner
 Pedro Víllora
 Robert Vendetti
 James Tynion IV
 B. Alex Thompson
 Teddy Tenenbaum
 Tom Taylor
 Matthew Sturges
 Morgan Spurlock
 Scott Snyder
 Gail Simone
 Liam Sharpe
 Chris Ryall
 Christina Rossetti
 Matthew Rosenberg
 Ashely Victoria Robinson
 James Robinson
 Rachel Rickey
 Ivan Reis
 J.R. Rand
 Ben Raab
 Dan Parent
 Jeff Parker
 Patton Oswalt
 Steve Orlando
 Nyambi Nyambi
 Scott Morse
 Grant Morrison
 Devon T.W. Morales
 Chris Miskiewicz
 Mark Millar
 Brad Meltzer
 T. Chick McClure
 Mary Jo Smith
 Gulliem March
 David Macho
 Ed Luce
 Scott Lope
 Damon Lindelof
 Tom King
 Jeff King
 Chuck Kim
 Taran Killam
 Joe Kelly
 Dave Justus
 Dan Jurgens
 Jeff Jensen
 Van Jensen
 Paul Jenkins
 Jason Inman
 Emma Houxbois
 Joe Harris
 Justin Hall
 Marc Guggenheim
 Sina Grace
 Christian Gossett
 Eddie Gorodetsky
 Christopher Golden
 Kieron Gillen
 Sterling Gates
 Chris and Ruth Gage
 Tee Franklin
 Steve Foxe
 Greg Fox
 Ross Fisher
 Joshua Hale Fialkov
 Al Ewing
 Jay Edidin
 Joshua Dysart
 Gerry Duggan
 Drew Droege
 David Drake
 Jeff Dixon
 Paul Dini
 Dan DiDio
 Amanda Deibert
 Nunzio DeFilippis
 Brenna Davis
 Dave Crossland
 Cecil Castellucci
 Mike Carlin
 Mike Carey
 Jeffrey Burandt
 Brian Buccellato
 Ivan Brandon
 Paige Braddock
 John Ross Bowie
 Matt Bomer
 Marc Bernardin
 Marguerite Bennett
 Brian Michael Bendis
 Tony Bedard
 Dan Beals
 Mark Badger
 Paul Azaceta
 David Avallone
 James Asmus
 Alejandro Arbona
 Roberto Aguirre-Sacasa
 Jason Aaron
 Marc Andreyko

Pencillers

 Fernando Blanco
 Patrick Zircher
 Leinil Yu
 Pete Woods
 Judd Winick
 Brad Walker
 Sean Von Gorman
 Jose Villarubia
 Emma Vieceli
 Max Vento
 Billy Tucci
 Wilfredo Torres
 Marcial Toledano
 Philip Tan
 Cat Staggs
 Jon Sommariva
 Mary Jo Smith
 Emily Smith
 Karl Slominski
 Liam Sharp
 David Sexton
 Tim Seeley
 Dan Schkade
 Victor Santos
 Jesus Saiz
 Steve Sadowski
 P. Craig Russell
 Stephane Roux
 Robbi Rodriguez
 Pedro Rodriguez
 Nick Robles
 Elayne and Robin Riggs
 Kevin Richardson
 Ivan Reis
 Paul Reinwald
 Steve Pugh
 Brandon Peterson
 George Perez
 Brent Peeples
 Dan Parent
 Jeff Parker
 Molly Knox Ostertag
 Alvar Ortiz
 Mike Oeming
 Phil Noto
 Troy Nixey
 Vivian Ng
 Amancay Nahuelpan
 Scott Morse
 Bill Morrison
 Rags Morales
 Travis Moore
 Karl Moline
 Guillermo Mogorron
 Jesus Merino
 Carla Speed McNeil
 Mike McKone
 Jeff McComsey
 T. Chick McClure
 Iain McCaig
 Shawn Martinbrough
 Gulliem March
 Francis Manapul
 David Mack
 Ed Luce
 John Lucas
 David Lopez
 Joseph Michael Linsner
 Jim Lee
 Iain Laurie
 Jason LaTour
 David LaFuente
 Jeff Krell
 Piotr Kowalski
 Tristan Jones
 Mark Simpson 'Jock'
 Phil Jimenez
 Austin James
 Jesus Iglesias
 Mike Huddleston
 Jonathan Hickman
 Cully Hamner
 Craig Hamilton
 Justin Hall
 Robert Hack
 Andrew Griffith
 Sina Grace
 Sarah Gordon
 Isaac Goodhart
 Mitch Gerads
 Ale Garza
 Lee Garbett
 Simon Fraser
 Greg Fox
 Sophia Foster-Dimino
 Sagar Fornies
 Tom Feister
 Garry Erskine
 Chris Eliopoulos
 Kieron Dwyer
 Ming Doyle
 Mike Dowling
 Carlos D’Anda
 Dave Crossland
 Barry Crain
 Matt Clark
 Yildray Cinar
 Vincente Cifuentes
 Jim Calafiore
 Stephen Byrne
 Mark Buckingham
 Andrei Bressan
 Paige Braddock
 Peter Bergting
 Gabriel Bautista
 Donna Barr
 Mark Badger
 Paul Azaceta
 Alejandro Gutierrez Franco
 Aneke
 Kaare Andrews
 Mirka Andolfo
 Jason Shaw Alexander
 Rafael Albuquerque
 Dave Acosta

Inkers

 Fernando Blanco
 Patrick Zircher
 Leinil Yu
 Pete Woods
 Judd Winick
 Brad Walker
 Sean Von Gorman
 Jose Villarubia
 Emma Vieceli
 Max Vento
 Billy Tucci
 Wilfredo Torres
 Marcial Toledano
 Philip Tan
 Cat Staggs
 Jon Sommariva
 Emily Smith
 Karl Slominski
 Liam Sharpe
 Tim Seeley
 Dan Schkade
 Victor Santos
 Jesus Saiz
 Steve Sadowski
 P. Craig Russell
 Stephane Roux
 Robbi Rodriguez
 Pedro Rodriguez
 Nick Robles
 Kevin Richardson
 Ivan Reis
 Paul Reinwald
 Steve Pugh
 Brandon Peterson
 Brent Peeples
 Dan Parent
 Jeff Parker
 Molly Knox Ostertag
 Alvar Ortiz
 Mike Oeming
 Phil Noto
 Troy Nixey
 Vivian Ng
 Amancay Nahuelpan
 Scott Morse
 Bill Morrison
 Rags Morales
 Travis Moore
 Karl Moline
 Guillermo Mogorron
 Carla Speed McNeil
 Mike McKone
 Jeff McComsey
 T. Chick McClure
 Mary Jo Smith
 Shawn Martinbrough
 Jesus Marino
 Gulliem March
 Francis Manapul
 David Mack
 Ed Luce
 John Lucas
 David Lopez
 Joseph Michael Linsner
 Iain Laurie
 Jason LaTour
 David LaFuente
 Jeff Krell
 Piotr Kowalski
 Karl Kesel
 Tristan Jones
 Mark Simpson 'Jock'
 Phil Jimenez
 Austin James
 Jesus Iglesias
 Mike Huddleston
 Jonathan Hickman
 Cully Hamner
 Craig Hamilton
 Justin Hall
 Robert Hack
 Andrew Griffith
 Sarah Gordon
 Isaac Goodhart
 Mitch Gerads
 Ale Garza
 Lee Garbett
 Simon Fraser
 Greg Fox
 Sophia Foster-Dimino
 Sagar Fornies
 Tom Feister
 Garry Erskine
 Chris Eliopoulos
 Kieron Dwyer
 Ming Doyle
 Mike Dowling
 Carlos D’Anda
 Dave Crossland
 Barry Crain
 Matt Clark
 Yildray Cinar
 Vincente Cifuentes
 Jim Calafiore
 Stephen Byrne
 Mark Buckingham
 Andrei Bressan
 Paige Braddock
 Peter Bergting
 Gabriel Bautista
 Donna Barr
 Mark Badger
 Paul Azaceta
 Alejandro Gutierrez Franco
 Aneke
 Kaare Andrews
 Mirka Andolfo
 Jason Shaw Alexander
 Rafael Albuquerque
 Dave Acosta

Colourists

 Fernando Blanco
 Yel Zamor
 Leinil Yu
 Pete Woods
 Judd Winick
 Michael Wiggam
 Brennan Wagner
 Jose Villarubia
 Max Vento
 Priscilla Tramontano
 Marcial Toledano
 Christina Strain
 Robert Stanley
 Cat Staggs
 Chris Sotomayor
 Taki Soma
 Karl Slominski
 Brad Simpson
 Dan Shadian
 Harry Saxon
 Victor Santos
 Elmer Santos
 K. Michael Russell
 Stephane Roux
 Robbi Rodriguez
 Pedro Rodriguez
 Nick Robles
 Elayne and Robin Riggs
 Ivan Reis
 Paul Reinwald
 Brandon Peterson
 Dan Parent
 Jeff Parker
 Molly Knox Ostertag
 Alvar Ortiz
 Phil Noto
 Vivian Ng
 Paul Mounts
 Scott Morse
 Karl Moline
 Guillermo Mogorron
 Carla Speed McNeil
 Mike McKone
 Jeff McComsey
 T. Chick McClure
 Mary Jo Smith
 Iain McCaig
 Jesus Marino
 Gulliem March
 Francis Manapul
 David Mack
 Ed Luce
 Adriano Lucas
 David Lopez
 Joseph Michael Linsner
 Jason LaTour
 David LaFuente
 Jeff Krell
 Lovern Kindzierski
 Mark Simpson 'Jock'
 Austin James
 Leonardo Ito
 Jesus Iglesias
 Mike Huddleston
 Jonathan Hickman
 Justin Hall
 Sina Grace
 Sarah Gordon
 Mitch Gerads
 Michael Garland
 Simon Fraser
 Greg Fox
 Sophia Foster-Dimino
 Sagar Fornies
 Tom Feister
 Antonio Fabela
 Mark Englert
 Chris Eliopoulos
 Kieron Dwyer
 Ming Doyle
 Mike Dowling
 Carlos D’Anda
 Andrew Dalhouse
 Dave Crossland
 Yildray Cinar
 Vincente Cifuentes
 Gabriel Cassata
 Stephen Byrne
 Mark Buckingham
 Giuilia Brusco
 Andrei Bressan
 Bo Bradshaw
 Paige Braddock
 Jordan Boyd
 Tyler Boss
 Tamra Bonvillian
 Fernando Blanco
 Peter Bergting
 Gabriel Bautista
 Donna Barr
 Mark Badger
 Paul Azaceta
 Mike Atiyeh
 Alejandro Gutierrez Franco
 Aneke
 Mirka Andolfo
 Laura Allred
 Jason Shaw Alexander
 Rafael Albuquerque
 Dave Acosta
 Hi-Fi (program created by colorist Brian Miller)

Letterers

 Jim Zub
 Patrick Zircher
 John Workman
 Russ Wooton
 Steve Wands
 Sean Von Gorman
 Max Vento
 Marcial Toledano
 Saida Temofonte
 Karl Slominski
 Dmyko Sienty
 Willie Schubert
 Victor Santos
 Jesus Saiz
 JG Roshell
 Pedro Rodriguez
 Ivan Reis
 Paul Reinwald
 Brandon Peterson
 Dan Parent
 Jeff Parker
 Molly Knox Ostertag
 Alvar Ortiz
 Phil Noto
 Chris Mowry
 Scott Morse
 Travis Moore
 Guillermo Mogorron
 Carla Speed McNeil
 Jeff McComsey
 T. Chick McClure
 Mary Jo Smith
 Gulliem March
 Carlos Manguel
 Ed Luce
 Jason LaTour
 Dave Lanphear
 Travis Lanham
 David LaFuente
 Todd Klein
 Austin James
 Jesus Iglesias
 Michael Heisler
 Craig Hamilton
 Justin Hall
 Sina Grace
 Simon Fraser
 Greg Fox
 Sophia Foster-Dimino
 Sagar Fornies
 Jared K. Fletcher
 Ryan Ferrier
 Taylor Esposito
 Kieron Dwyer
 Dave Crossland
 Joshua Cozine
 Elisa M. Coletti
 Sal Cipriano
 Janice Chiang
 Stephen Byrne
 Ed Brisson
 Corey Breen
 Paige Braddock
 Peter Bergting
 Deron Bennett
 Gabriel Bautista
 Donna Barr
 Neal Bailey
 Mark Badger
 Alejandro Gutierrez Franco
 Jason Shaw Alexander
 Dave Acosta

Editors
 Marc Andreyko
 Sarah Gaydos
 Robert 'Bob' Harras
 David Hedgecock
 Maggie Howell
 Jamie S. Rich
 Chris Ryall

Cover artists
 Jordie Bellaire
 Elsa Charretier
 Steve Cook

Other creators

 Patty Jenkins (introduction)
 J.K. Rowling (loaned out characters and text from her novels)
 Marc Andreyko (afterword)
 Steve Cook (logo design)
 Lou Prand (layouts)
 David Drake (adaption)
 Dennis Calero
 Olivier Coipel
 Amanda Connor
 Andrew Constant
 Deyns Cowan
 Crank!
 Arvind Ethan Davis
 Vito Delsante
 Shannon Eric Denton
 Kelly Fitzpatrick
 Javier Grillo-Marxuach
 Michael Hoeweler
 Douglas Holgate
 Rantz Hoseley
 Kike Infame
 Shawn Lee
 Vince Locke
 Julian Lopez
 Kevin Mellon
 Richard Ortiz
 Greg Pak
 Livio Ramondelli
 Kelsey Shannon
 Scott Shaw
 Frank Tieri
 Jill Thompson
 Josh Trujillo
 Zeb Wells

Stories
Many of the stories featured in Love is Love revolve around LGBT-related relationships and discrimination, and they sometimes utilize pop culture icons such as Poison Ivy, Harley Quinn (who are put into a lesbian relationship), Deathstroke, and Wonder Woman. One comic is about a superhero, Rainbow Boy, who uses his powers to fight "Doc Drumpf" and his armies of "Spider Haters".

Reception
Love is Love won the 2017 Eisner Award for Best Anthology. The book holds an average rating of 9.6 by five professional critics on the review aggregation website Comic Book Roundup.

The book was banned in a Texas school due to "extreme homosexuality".

References

External links
 Love Is Love at the Comic Book DB

2016 graphic novels
Censored books
Comics anthologies
DC Comics graphic novels
Eisner Award winners for Best Anthology
Harry Potter
IDW Publishing titles
LGBT-related graphic novels
LGBT anthologies
Orlando nightclub shooting
2016 anthologies